The Mixed 10m Air Rifle Prone SH1 shooting event at the 2004 Summer Paralympics was competed  on 22 September. It was won by Jonas Jacobsson, representing .

Preliminary

22 Sept. 2004, 09:00

Final round

22 Sept. 2004, 12:15

References

X